Dungu-Uye Airport  is an airport serving the Kibali River town of Dungu in Haut-Uélé Province, Democratic Republic of the Congo. The airport is just south of the river.

See also

 Transport in the Democratic Republic of the Congo
 List of airports in the Democratic Republic of the Congo

References

External links
 OpenStreetMap - Dungu-Uye Airport
 OurAirports - Dungu-Uye Airport
 Dungu-Uye Airport
 

Airports in Haut-Uélé